Arnold Ezekiel "Squiggy" Squitieri (February 2, 1936 – January 27, 2022) was an American former acting boss and underboss of the Gambino crime family. He is also known as "Zeke", "Bozey", and "Squitty".

Biography

Murder charge
On August 18, 1970, Squitieri shot garment cutter Desiderio Caban five times on a street in East Harlem. Two New York Police Department (NYPD) officers heard the shots, chased Squitieri by car for six blocks, until Squitieri finally stopped. Getting out of his car, Squitieri approached the officers and told them:

Don't worry about it, he's only shot in the arm. Let me go; the boys will take care of you. 

A week later mobster Alphonse Sisca met with one of the officers and offered a $5,000 bribe to the policemen. They accepted the deal and removed Squitieri's name from the crime report for the Caban killing. Later on, after the bribery was discovered, the officers were indicted and Squitieri became a fugitive from justice. In January 1972, Squitieri surrendered to authorities.

In 1973, while awaiting trial for the Caban murder, Squitieri and his wife Marie were charged with failing to file U.S. federal income tax returns for three years.  The couple had concealed $200,000 in income in bank accounts under false names. For the tax charges, Squitieri would serve four years in prison.

On March 14, 1973, Squitieri pleaded guilty to first degree manslaughter in the 1970 Caban murder. Squitieri was later sentenced to eight years in state prison.

After prison release
In May 1981, Squitieri was released from prison and soon began selling narcotics for the Gotti crew in New Jersey. In 1982, Squitieri was being supplied with heroin by Angelo Ruggiero and Gene Gotti. In 1986, after John Gotti replaced Paul Castellano as Gambino boss, Squitieri was inducted into the family.

In 1988, Squitieri was convicted in Camden, New Jersey of conspiring to distribute heroin and was sentenced to more than 11 years in prison. In 1999, boss John Gotti promoted Squitieri to underboss. On March 13, 1999, Squitieri was released from prison. In 2002, after the arrest of Gambino acting boss Peter Gotti, Squitieri became the new acting boss.

While on parole from prison, Squitieri received a flat panel television as a gift from undercover FBI agent Joaquín "Jack" García. One evening, Squitieri was watching the TV series about the Cosa Nostra, The Sopranos (All Happy Families...). On the show, family boss Anthony Soprano wants to have a troublesome family member returned to prison. To do this, he sends the mobster a stolen TV set. Soprano then arranges for a parole officer to visit the man and arrest him for possessing stolen property. When the show was over, a frightened Squitieri gave away the TV and purchased his own.

Confrontation with Rudaj
During the early and mid 2000s Squitieri had to contend with ethnic Albanian gangs’ involvement with the gambling rackets in Queens. One particular threat was with the Rudaj Organization (or "The Corporation"), run by mobster Alex Rudaj. At first, Gregory DePalma was able to solve minor disputes, but the Corporation became less cooperative over time.

In September 2005, Squitieri arranged a meeting with Rudaj at a gas station in New Jersey. When the Corporation mobsters arrived, 20 armed Gambino men confronted them. FBI undercover agent known as Jack Falcone stated in his book that Squitieri told the Corporation mobsters, "You took what you took and that's it or there's gonna be a problem." The Gambinos outnumbered the Corporation 20 to 6. Rudaj ordered one of his men to shoot a gas tank if a gunfight ensued.  Rudaj eventually listened to advice and stopped interfering with Gambino operations.

Return to prison
On March 9, 2005, Squitieri was arrested on charges of extorting money from construction companies in Westchester County, New York, Mineola, New York, and New Jersey.  On June 15, a tearful Squitieri pleaded guilty to conducting an illegal gambling operation and to tax evasion. On June 28, 2006 Squitieri was sentenced to just over seven years in federal prison.

Squitieri was incarcerated at the Devens Federal Medical Center (FMC) in Massachusetts. He was released on December 7, 2012.

Squitieri died on January 27, 2022, aged 85.

References

External links
July 28 2006 Dept. of Justice Press Release

1936 births
2022 deaths
Gambino crime family
Bosses of the Gambino crime family
American gangsters of Italian descent
People from Englewood Cliffs, New Jersey
American people convicted of manslaughter
Prisoners and detainees of the United States federal government
Prisoners and detainees of New Jersey
American people convicted of tax crimes
American drug traffickers